Jessica Wich (born 14 July 1990 in Kronach) is a German football striker. She currently plays for Bayer 04 Leverkusen.

Career

Clubs

Jessica Wich began her career at the age of 6 years at SV Höfles/Vogtendorf. She then moved to TSF Theisenort followed by SV Reitsch. In 2006 Wich moved to SC Regensburg which just won promotion for the second division. She scored four goals in her first season. Just one year later at the age of 17 she moved to Potsdam and played for one of the best female German soccer clubs 1. FFC Turbine Potsdam. On 26 August 2007 she scored her first Bundesliga goal against SG Wattenscheid 09. In January 2008, she won her first national title with the DFB-Hallenpokal. In her first Bundesliga season, she was the most successful scorer of her team with 13 goals. A year later she won with Potsdam the DFB-Hallenpokal again and got her first German championship title. She was also part of the squad, who one the UEFA Champions League in 2010. Thoughtout her four seasons at Potsdam she scored 35 goals in 82 appearances in the Bundesliga, the Bundesliga Cup and Champions League. In June 2011 she announced her transfer to Hamburg. After the season 2011/12 Wich joined the club 1. FFC Frankfurt signing a three-year contract. In this period she had 22 appearances and won the DFB-Pokal. On May 20, 2014, Bayer 04 Leverkusen announced Wich's commitment to the season 2014/15. Wich played for Leverkusen for several seasons, staying after the club's relegation.

International

She made her debut with the Germany women's under-15 national football team on 29 August 2005 and scored three goals against Scotland. With the U17 team, she finished third in the Nordic Cup in 2006 and 2007. In 2008, she reached the semi-finals at the 2008 U19 European Championship in France with the U19 national team and won the FIFA U20 World Cup of 2010 at home in Germany.

Honours
Clubs
 UEFA Women's Champions League Winner 2010 (1. FFC Turbine Potsdam)
 German Champion 2009, 2010, 2011 (1. FFC Turbine Potsdam)
 DFB-Pokal Winner 2014 (1. FFC Frankfurt)
 DFB-Hallenpokal Winner 2008, 2009, 2010 (1. FFC Turbine Potsdam), 2015 (Bayer 04 Leverkusen)

International
 Semi-finalist at 2008 UEFA Women's U19 Championship
 2010 FIFA U20 World Cup winner

References

External links
 

1990 births
Living people
People from Kronach (district)
German women's footballers
1. FFC Frankfurt players
1. FFC Turbine Potsdam players
Bayer 04 Leverkusen (women) players
Hamburger SV (women) players
Women's association football forwards